Naphthalene-1-sulfonic acid is an organic compound with the formula C10H7SO3H.  A colorless, water-soluble solid, it is often available as the dihydrate C10H7SO3H.2H2O.  It is one of two monosulfonic acids of naphthalene, the other being the more stable naphthalene-2-sulfonic acid.  The compound is mainly used in the production of dyes.

Naphthalene-1-sulfonic acid undergoes many reactions, some of which are or were of commercial interest.  Upon heating with dilute aqueous acid, it reverts to naphthalene.  Fusion with sodium hydroxide followed by acidification gives 1-naphthol.  Further sulfonation gives 1,5-naphthalene-disulfonic acid. Reduction with triphenylphosphine gives 1-naphthalenethiol.

References

Naphthalenesulfonic acids
1-Naphthyl compounds